This article concerns the period 389 BC – 380 BC.

References